Nayarnamtales is a village development committee in Palpa District in the Lumbini Zone of southern Nepal. At the time of the 2011 Nepal census it had a population of 2,153 people living in 534 individual households.

References

See also

Palpa District
Populated places in Palpa District